John McEnroe was the defending champion but lost in the final 6–2, 3–6, 6–3, 6–3 to Ivan Lendl.

Seeds
A champion seed is indicated in bold text while text in italics indicates the round in which that seed was eliminated.

  John McEnroe (final)
  Ivan Lendl (champion)

Draw

References
1982 World Championship Tennis Finals Draw (Archived 2009-05-07)

Singles